Schistura quaesita is a species of ray-finned fish, a stone loach, in the genus Schistura. It has only been recorded from a single locality in the Nam Ngum drainage in Laos where it was seen in streams with a moderate to fast flow, among riffles, over beds made up of gravel or stone.

References

Q
Fish described in 2000